Flight 603 may refer to:

Continental Airlines Flight 603 which aborted a takeoff due to landing gear failure on 1 March, 1978
Aeroperú Flight 603 which crashed into the Pacific Ocean due to a maintenance error on 2 October, 1996

0603